Nicholas Monroe and Simon Stadler were the defending champions but decided not to participate.
Emilio Gómez and Roman Borvanov won the final 6–3, 7–6(7–4) against Nicolás Barrientos and Eduardo Struvay.

Seeds

Draw

Draw

References
 Main Draw

Seguros Bolivar Open Medellin - Doubles
2013 Doubles